Shibuya Productions is a Monaco-based entertainment production company.

History 
Shibuya Productions was co-founded by Cédric Biscay and Kostadin Yanev in July 2014.

In 2015, Shibuya Productions announced a reboot of Astro Boy with Caribara Animation and Tezuka Productions.

In June 2015, during E3, Shibuya Productions announced Shenmue III with YS net. They launched a Kickstarter crowdfunding in order to raise $2 million for the game's development and launch. The campaign successfully secured over $6,333,295 from 69,320 backers.

In February 2016, Shibuya Productions announced Cobra: Return of Joe Gillian a new Cobra series about Rugball.

They produced the first Bulgarian animation feature: Lilly and the Magic Pearl, directed by Anri Koulev, with the voice of Ben Cross.

In 2020, they worked on Twin Mirror. They also worked the Activ5 fitness device.

They produce the animated series Petz Club, broadcast on the French TV France 4.

References

External links 

Mass media companies of Monaco
Video game development companies
Video game companies established in 2014
2014 establishments in Europe